Gabdegah (also Romanized as Gābdegāh; also known as Gowdehgāv, Gowdgāh, and Gūdgāh) is a village in Jereh Rural District, Jereh and Baladeh District, Kazerun County, Fars Province, Iran. At the 2006 census, its population was 98, in 21 families.

References 

Populated places in Kazerun County